XHITT-FM (88.7 MHz) is a public radio station in Tijuana, Mexico, owned by the Instituto Tecnológico de Tijuana.

While the technological institute had sought a station since 1977, XHITT received its initial permit on September 30, 1986, but transmissions did not begin until June 13, 1987, at 5:17 p.m., when Héctor Magaña, the station manager, exclaimed "¡Buenas tardes, Tijuana!" (Good afternoon, Tijuana!) on the station. Formal transmissions began on October 29.

References

Radio stations in Tijuana
Radio stations established in 1987
Public radio in Mexico